Rosette or Seibel 1000 is a wine hybrid grape red-berries variety which originated with the work of Albert Seibel by a crossing of Jaeger 70 with Vitis vinifera. Rosette is also the common ancestor of St. Pepin and La Crosse grapes. Rosette is used to produce rosé wine.

See also
 Seibel grapes

Red wine grape varieties
Seibel grapes